Chashmasor is a village and jamoat in Tajikistan. It is located in Fayzobod District, one of the Districts of Republican Subordination. It consists of 7 villages, including Chashmasor (the seat) and Takhtialif.

References

Populated places in Districts of Republican Subordination
Jamoats of Tajikistan